"I'm for Love" is a single by American singer-songwriter and musician Hank Williams Jr.  It was released in May 1985 as the first single from the album Five-O.  The single was Williams Jr.'s seventh number one on the country chart.  The single went to number one for one week and spent a total of fifteen weeks on the country chart. The A-side was written by Williams. The B-side was a cover of Warren Zevon's song "Lawyers, Guns and Money".

Charts

Weekly charts

Year-end charts

References

1985 songs
1985 singles
Hank Williams Jr. songs
Songs written by Hank Williams Jr.
Song recordings produced by Jimmy Bowen
Warner Records singles
Curb Records singles